Sok Soty is a Cambodian politician. He belongs to the Sam Rainsy Party and was elected to represent Phnom Penh in the National Assembly of Cambodia in 2003.

References

Members of the National Assembly (Cambodia)
Candlelight Party politicians
Living people
Year of birth missing (living people)
Place of birth missing (living people)